Alex Stuart may refer to:

Alex Stuart (writer), pseudonym used by the writer Violet Stuart (1914–1986)
Alex Stuart (footballer) (born 1941), Scottish former footballer
Alex Verrijn Stuart (1922–2004), Dutch computer scientist

See also
Alexander Stuart (disambiguation) 
Alex Stewart (disambiguation)
Alexander Stewart (disambiguation)